Peter Phelps (born 28 March 1945) is a former competition swimmer who represented Australia at the 1964 Summer Olympics in Tokyo.  Phelps competed in the preliminary heats of the men's 100-metre freestyle event, finishing with a time of 56.1 seconds.  He previously anchored the Australian gold medal team in the 4×110-yard freestyle relay at the 1962 British Empire and Commonwealth Games in Perth.

Phelps worked in the printing industry for many years in Sydney, before retiring in mid-2012.

See also
 List of Commonwealth Games medallists in swimming (men)

References

1945 births
Living people
Australian male freestyle swimmers
Olympic swimmers of Australia
Swimmers at the 1964 Summer Olympics
Swimmers at the 1962 British Empire and Commonwealth Games
Commonwealth Games medallists in swimming
Commonwealth Games gold medallists for Australia
20th-century Australian people
Medallists at the 1962 British Empire and Commonwealth Games